Abraham Lesieur Desaulniers (December 17, 1822 – January 23, 1883) was a politician in the province of Quebec, Canada.  He served as Member of the Legislative Assembly.

Early life

He was born on December 17, 1822, in Yamachiche, Mauricie.  He was an attorney.

Municipal Politics

He was a Council member in Trois-Rivières in 1854.

Provincial Politics

In 1867, Desaulniers, who was a Conservative, became the Member of the Legislative Assembly for the district of Saint-Maurice.  He did not run for re-election in 1871.

Death

He died on January 23, 1883.

References

1822 births
1883 deaths
Conservative Party of Quebec MNAs